Dodam-dong is neighborhood of Sejong City, South Korea.

External links
 Dodam-dong 

Neighbourhoods in Sejong City